Carenum politissimum is a species of ground beetle in the subfamily Scaritinae. It was described by Maximilien Chaudoir in 1868.

References

Politissimum
Beetles described in 1868